The Chevrolet Bolt EUV (short for "electric utility vehicle") is a battery electric subcompact crossover SUV manufactured by General Motors under the Chevrolet marque. It was revealed on February 14, 2021. It is a larger version of the similarly-named Chevrolet Bolt EV, with which it shares its BEV2 platform and powertrain.

History

The Bolt EUV was introduced in February 2021, and released to the Mexican market on August 17, 2021. As the first EUVs were arriving at dealerships in August 2021, all vehicles were recalled to replace the traction battery; Bolt EV and EUV production was paused from November 2021 to April 2022, and fewer than 400 Bolts (both EV and EUV) were delivered before April.

It is the first Chevrolet vehicle to receive the hands-free Super Cruise driver-assistance package.

Unlike early versions of the Bolt EV, the battery for the Bolt EUV is manufactured in the United States at LG plants in Michigan.

Pricing and trims
The Chevrolet Bolt EUV has 3 trim levels, beginning with LT, which starts at $33,000. The next pricing rung is Premier, which sits at $37,500. Last there is the Launch Edition at $42,500. For the 2023 model year a Redline Edition was introduced.

Specifications

Range and efficiency 

Under the U.S. Environmental Protection Agency (EPA) five-cycle test methodology, the Bolt EV fuel economy is rated at:
  miles per gallon gasoline equivalent for combined driving
  in city driving
  in highway driving

The Bolt EUV's EPA-rated range for:
 combined driving is  
 city driving is 
 highway driving is

Charging 
The Bolt EUV can charge through the SAE J1772 connector using electric vehicle supply equipment connected to an AC power supply. A portable AC EVSE (made by Webasto) is included that can operate at Level 1 (8 or 12-amps) using the NEMA 5-15 dongle and Level 2 (32 amps) using the NEMA 14-50 dongle. At 12-Amps, the maximum for a typical household socket, it adds  of charge per hour. It takes approximately  hours for a full charge.

The EUV is equipped with DC fast charging as standard, using a CCS Combo 1 plug with a maximum rate of 55 kW. At this rate, the range replenishes at  every 30 minutes.

Dimensions 
Although the cargo volume of the EUV is slightly smaller than the EV, this is due to the methodology of SAE J1100, the recommended practice used to compute volume; manufacturer testing demonstrated the EUV can hold more cargo.

Interior 
The Super Cruise advanced driver-assistance system and a panoramic sunroof are available exclusively for the Bolt EUV; the Bolt EV lacks both options. Front headroom is slightly reduced with the sunroof.

References

External links 

 

Bolt EUV
Cars introduced in 2021
Production electric cars
Mini sport utility vehicles
Crossover sport utility vehicles